Governor's Harbour Airport is an airport in Governor's Harbour on Eleuthera in the Bahamas .

Airlines and destinations

References

Airports in the Bahamas
Eleuthera